The Church of the Messiah at 728–30 Broadway, near Waverly Place in Greenwich Village, Manhattan, New York City, was dedicated in 1839 and operated as a church until 1864. In January 1865 it was sold to department store magnate Alexander Turney Stewart and converted into a theater, which subsequently operated under a series of names, including Globe Theatre, and ending with New Theatre Comique. It burned down in 1884.

Theater names and managers
The following information comes from Brown (page numbers in parentheses):

References

Notes

Sources

Broadway (Manhattan)
Building and structure fires in New York City
Demolished theatres in New York City
Demolished buildings and structures in Manhattan
Former theatres in Manhattan
Greenwich Village
Churches completed in 1839
1865 establishments in New York (state)